Kumkum Chatterjee (née Banerjee; 12 June 1958, in Kolkata – 13 December 2012, in State College, Pennsylvania) was an Indian American historian, best known for her works Europe Observed: Multiple Gazes in Early Modern Encounters (2008) and The Cultures of History in Early Modern India (2009). She was professor of history and Asian studies at Pennsylvania State University.

References 

1958 births
2012 deaths
Indian historians